Malawi requires its residents to register their motor vehicles and display vehicle registration plates.

References

External links

Malawi
Transport in Malawi
Malawi transport-related lists